Morristown is an unincorporated community and census-designated place (CDP) in Maricopa County, Arizona, United States. As of the 2020 census, it had a population of 186, down from 227 in 2010.

Morristown is home to the Morristown Elementary School District.

The Morristown Store, formerly the Morristown Hotel, is listed on the National Register of Historic Places.

Much of Morristown is within the municipal planning area of Surprise, and Surprise intends to eventually annex the area. The portion of Morristown south of US 60, however, exists in a small area between the planning areas of Surprise, Buckeye and Wickenburg, where neither city has yet expressed a planned interest in expanding. The community is named after Morristown, New Jersey.

Morristown is also known for being the birthplace of famed Internet celebrity cat, Grumpy Cat.

Demographics 

As of the census of 2010, there were 227 people living in the CDP. The population density was 508.1 people per square mile. The racial makeup of the CDP was 96% White, 3% from other races, and 1% from two or more races. 5% of the population were Hispanic or Latino of any race.

Gallery

See also
 Castle Hot Springs (Arizona)
 Hieroglyphic Mountains

References

Census-designated places in Maricopa County, Arizona